The Edgerton Bible Case (formally State ex rel. Weiss v. District Board of School District No. Eight, 76 Wis. 177) was an important court case involving religious instruction in public schools in the U.S. state of Wisconsin.  The case was unanimously decided in favor of the appellants, declaring that the use of the King James Bible in Edgerton, Wisconsin, public schools was unconstitutional sectarian education.

Background

In the early days of Edgerton, Wisconsin, it was common practice for public school teachers to read aloud to their students from the King James Bible.  In 1886, Roman Catholic parents protested about this to the school board, citing their belief that the Douay version of the Bible was the only correct translation for their children. 

After failing to convince the school board to end the practice, the parents—     and —took their case to court. In November 1888, the circuit court judge, John R. Bennett, decided that the readings were not sectarian because both translations were of the same work. The parents then appealed the decision to the Wisconsin Supreme Court. 

In State ex rel Weiss v. District Board 76 Wis. 177 (1890), 3, otherwise known as the Edgerton Bible Case, the judges overruled the circuit court's decision, concluding that it illegally united the functions of church and state. 

In 1963, the United States Supreme Court banned government-sponsored compulsory prayer from public schools (see Abington School District v. Schempp), and Justice William Brennan, Jr. cited the Edgerton Bible Case in his decision.

References

Further reading

External links
 Odd Wisconsin: Edgerton Bible case helped set a key precedent

United States education case law
Establishment Clause case law
Law articles needing an infobox
1890 in United States case law
Wisconsin state case law
1890 in education
1890 in Wisconsin
1890 in Christianity
Education in Rock County, Wisconsin
United States lawsuits
Catholic Church in Wisconsin
Bible versions and translations
King James Version